Bagayarich (also spelled Bagayarič, Bagarich or Bagarinch) was an ancient locality in the northwestern part of Armenia in the district of Daranali (or Daranałi[k]). The site is located near the village of Çadırkaya (formerly Pekeriç) in Turkey's Erzincan Province,  kilometers west of the modern city of Erzurum (ancient Karin). In ancient times, it housed the cult centre of the divinity Mihr (Mithra i.e. Mithras), the god of fire.

Name
The name of Bagayarich is attested in Greek by the ancient geographer and historian Strabo (died ) as *Bagaris and Basgoidariza, and by Ptolemy (died ), likewise in Greek, as *Bagarizaka. The modern Turkish name is Pekeriç, and its new official name of Cadırkaya means "tent-rock".

Geography
Bagayarich is located near the northeastern corner of the Pekeriç plain. This plain is separated from the Vican plain downstream on the Tuzla Su by a series of low hills. Bagayarich itself is located at the base of a large conical rock which historically was the site of the town's fortress. The village consists of two distinct "lobes".

In ancient times, the locality of Bagayarich was situated on the primary road passing through northern Armenia that linked the town of Sebastaea (present-day Sivas) in the Roman Empire with Ecbatana (present-day Hamadan) in Media through Satala, Bagayarich, Karin (present-day Erzurum) and Artaxata (Artashat).

History
The locality was known for being the site of the important temple of Mihr (i.e. Mithra, Mithras), that is, one of the eight main pagan shrines of pre-Christian Armenia. It was traditionally held to have been built by King Tigranes the Great (95-56 BC). The site first appears in Armenian historiography in late antique works. Within this context, according to Agathangelos, the temple of Mihr at Bagayarich was destroyed by Gregory the Illuminator. The modern historian Robert H. Hewsen explains that the entire surrounding district of Daranali may have been part of the domain of the aforementioned Mihr temple, as, after it was destroyed during the conversion of Armenia to Christianity, the district of Daranali was turned into the property of the Armenian church.

Bagayarich was historically the capital of the district of Derzene. It has since been superseded by the town of Tercan, which perhaps took place in the early Ottoman period.

By the 20th century, Bagayarich was composed of two adjoining villages by the name of Verin ("upper") and Nerkin ("lower") Bagayarich, which respectively consisted of 80 and 130 homes. Half of these homes were inhabited by Armenians and the other half by local Muslims. The two villages of Verin and Nerkin Bagayarich together formed the larger village in the caza ("district") of Derjan. At the time, the remains of what may have been the temple as well as an old castle could still be viewed at Bagayarich.

Present status
The site's main focus in the present day is a conical hill. A simple radio tower is located at the peak of the site including some remnants of rough stone-and-mortar masonry dating back to the 19th or 20th century.

References

Sources
 
 
 

Ancient Armenia
Zoroastrianism
Former populated places in Turkey